Lake Township is one of the seventeen townships of Stark County, Ohio, United States.  It is an urban township; the 2000 census found 25,892 people in the township, 23,718 of whom lived in the unincorporated portions of the township.

Geography
Located in the northern part of the county, it borders the following townships and cities:
Suffield Township, Portage County - north
Randolph Township, Portage County - northeast
Marlboro Township - east
Nimishillen Township - southeast corner
Plain Township - south
Jackson Township - southwest corner
Green - west
Springfield Township, Summit County - northwest

Several populated places are located in Lake Township (incorporated areas are not part of the Township):
The village of Hartville, in the northeast
The census-designated place of Greentown, in the southwest
The census-designated place of Uniontown, in the northwest
The unincorporated community of Mount Pleasant, in the southwest
Two other unincorporated communities straddle Lake Township's borders: Aultman, which overlaps into Green within the southwest portion of the township, and Cairo, which lies upon the township's southern border with Plain Township.

Name and history

Lake Township became its own stand alone civil township in 1816 after its original formation as a survey township within Plain Township then in 1806 within Green Township. Statewide, other Lake Townships are located in Ashland, Logan, and Wood counties.

Government
The township is governed by a three-member board of trustees, who are elected in November of odd-numbered years to a four-year term beginning on the following January 1. Two are elected in the year after the presidential election and one is elected in the year before it. There is also an elected township fiscal officer, who serves a four-year term beginning on April 1 of the year after the election, which is held in November of the year before the presidential election. Vacancies in the fiscal officership or on the board of trustees are filled by the remaining trustees.

Education
The northern and eastern halves of the township (including Hartville) comprise the majority of the Lake Local School District, home to Lake Middle/High School. However, the southwestern quarter of the township is zoned to North Canton City School District, and a small area in the far southeast corner of the township is part of the Plain Local School District.

References

External links
Township website
County website
Lake Local Schools
Lake Township Historical Society

Townships in Stark County, Ohio
Urban townships in Ohio
Townships in Ohio